Fiston Bokungu Ndjoli (born 29 July 1986) is a Congolese former footballer who played as a midfielder.

References

1986 births
Living people
Footballers from Kinshasa
Democratic Republic of the Congo footballers
Democratic Republic of the Congo international footballers
Association football midfielders
Democratic Republic of the Congo expatriate footballers
Expatriate footballers in Azerbaijan
Democratic Republic of the Congo expatriate sportspeople in Azerbaijan
Expatriate footballers in Belgium
Democratic Republic of the Congo expatriate sportspeople in Belgium
Expatriate footballers in Rwanda
Democratic Republic of the Congo expatriate sportspeople in Rwanda
Expatriate footballers in Angola
Democratic Republic of the Congo expatriate sportspeople in Angola
Expatriate footballers in Gabon
Democratic Republic of the Congo expatriate sportspeople in Gabon
AS Vita Club players
Gabala FC players
Royale Union Saint-Gilloise players
Daring Club Motema Pembe players
APR F.C. players
Atlético Sport Aviação players
Kabuscorp S.C.P. players
AS Mangasport players
União Sport Clube do Uíge players
21st-century Democratic Republic of the Congo people